Walworth is a hamlet (and census-designated place) in the Town of Walworth, Wayne County, New York, United States. It is located in the southeastern corner of the town, six miles (10 km) north-northeast of the hamlet of Macedon, at an elevation of 541 feet (165 m). The primary cross roads where the hamlet is located are Penfield-Walworth Road (CR 205), Walworth-Marion Road (CR 207), Walworth-Ontario Road and Walworth Road (CR 208). N.Y. Route 350 passes just west of Walworth. Government offices for the Town of Walworth are located in the hamlet.

A United States Post Office is located in Walworth with a ZIP Code of 14568.

History
The hamlet was originally known as Douglass Corners from 1801 to 1825, named after brothers Stephen and Daniel Douglass who settled in the area.

References

External links
Walworth-Seely Public Library
Walworth Historical Society
Walworth Fire Department, Inc.

Populated places in Wayne County, New York
Hamlets in Wayne County, New York
Hamlets in New York (state)